Tahajjud, also known as the "night prayer", is a voluntary prayer performed by followers of Islam. It is not one of the five obligatory prayers required of all Muslims, although the Islamic prophet, Muhammad was recorded as performing the tahajjud prayer regularly himself and encouraging his companions too.

Evidence in the Qur'an
In Fiqh As-Sunnah, Sheikh Sayyid Sabiq elaborates on the subject of Tahajjud  as follows:

Evidence in hadith 
Next to these Qur'anic verses, there also exist a number of hadiths (narrated and confirmed traditions from Muhammad) that reinforce the importance of Tahajjud Prayer. In various hadiths, it has been mentioned as Qiyamul Sabah (standing of morning), Salatul Sabah (prayer of morning) and Tahajjud.

Recommended time

To perform tahajjud signifies the act of rising from sleep during the night and then praying.

Tahajjud may be performed before or after Emsak (when the fasting starts) but before the obligatory  Fajr prayer.

Commenting on this subject, Ibn Hajar says:

"The best time for tahajjud is the last third portion of the night." (Abu Hurairah: Fiqh)

`Amr ibn `Absah claimed that he heard Muhammad as saying:

Masruq ibn al-Ajda' narrated:

Number of rakats
Tahajjud Prayer does not entail a specific number of rak`ahs that must be performed, nor is there any maximum limit that may be performed. It would be fulfilled even if one prayed just one rak`ah of Witr after `Ishaa'; however, it is traditionally prayed with at least two rak'at which is known as shif'a followed by witr as this is what Muhammad did before fajr.

Abdullah ibn Umar narrated that Muhammad said:

Bukhari, Hadith 990

References

External links
 Tahajjud information at Arabian Tongue 
 Tahajjud prayer time calculator

Salah
Salah terminology